Alberto Di Chiara (born 29 March 1964) is an Italian former professional footballer, who played for Roma, Reggiana, Lecce, Fiorentina, Parma and Perugia, as well as for the Italian national side, as a winger and full back. He is the younger brother of the Italian footballer Stefano Di Chiara.

Club career
A Roma youth product, he made his Serie A debut with the club during the 1980–81 Serie A season, also winning the Coppa Italia that year. After two seasons with the club, he was transferred to Serie B side Reggiana in 1982, making 22 appearances.

In 1983, he was acquired by  Lecce for the following season. He helped the club achieve an historic first-time promotion to Serie A during the 1984–85 season, his second year with the club. During the 1985–86 Serie A season, he played alongside his brother Stefano under manager Eugenio Fascetti.

Between 1986 and 1991, he played with Fiorentina, collecting 122 appearances and 10 goals in Serie A over five seasons. Although he was initially acquired as a winger in 1986, the club's new Brazilian manager at the time, Sebastião Lazaroni decided to deploy him as an attacking full-back or wing-back, in the mould of offensive, Brazilian attacking fullbacks, such as Djalma Santos, due to Di Chiara's pace, technical ability, and his offensive style of play. During his time at the club, he reached the 1990 UEFA Cup Final.

In 1991, he joined Parma, where he remained until 1996, during one of the club's most successful periods, playing predominantly in his new full-back role under manager Nevio Scala, also achieving his first call-up to the national side. During his time at the club, he formed a notable partnership with fellow attacking full-back Antonio Benarrivo, and he won the 1991–92 Coppa Italia, the 1992–93 European Cup Winners' Cup, the 1993 UEFA Super Cup, and the 1994–95 UEFA Cup, also achieving runners-up medals in the 1992 Supercoppa Italiana, the 1994 UEFA Cup Winners' Cup Final, and in the 1995 Coppa Italia Final, as well as a third-place finish in Serie A in 1995. After leaving the club in 1996, he ended his career after a season with Perugia, retiring in 1997.

International career
After representing the Italy under-21 side twice in 1985, Di Chiara also represented the Italian senior national side as a fullback on 7 occasions between 1992 and 1993, while playing for Parma. He was the first ever Parma player to be called up for Italy, making his debut on 31 May 1992, in a 0–0 home draw against Portugal, under manager Arrigo Sacchi.

Style of play
Di Chiara was a consistent and offensive-minded left-footed full-back, who was capable of playing anywhere along the left flank; throughout his career, he was also used as a winger, or as a wing-back. His pace, flair, composure, stamina, technical skills, and attacking instincts enabled him to charge down the wing, beat opponents, and create chances for teammates with accurate crosses.

Honours
Roma
Coppa Italia: 1980–81

Parma
Coppa Italia: 1991–92
UEFA Cup Winners' Cup: 1992–93
UEFA Super Cup: 1993
UEFA Cup: 1994–95

References

1964 births
Living people
Italian footballers
Italy under-21 international footballers
Italy international footballers
ACF Fiorentina players
A.S. Roma players
U.S. Lecce players
Parma Calcio 1913 players
A.C. Reggiana 1919 players
A.C. Perugia Calcio players
Serie A players
Serie B players
Association football fullbacks
Association football wingers
UEFA Cup winning players
Footballers from Rome